The 1927 Southwestern Lynx football team was an American football team that represented Southwestern Presbyterian University (now known as Rhodes College) as an Independent during the 1927 college football season. Led by Jess Neely in his second season as head coach, the Lynx compiled a record of 5–5–1.

Schedule

References

Southwestern
Rhodes Lynx football seasons
Southwestern Lynx football